Perthida pentaspila is a moth of the family Incurvariidae. It was described by Edward Meyrick in 1916. It is found in Victoria.

References

Moths described in 1916
Incurvariidae